The 1933 Missouri Tigers football team was an American football team that represented the University of Missouri in the Big Six Conference (Big 6) during the 1933 college football season. The team compiled a 1–8 record (0–5 against Big 6 opponents), finished in sixth place in the Big 6, and was outscored by all opponents by a combined total of 193 to 58. Frank Carideo was the head coach for the second of three seasons. The team played its home games at Memorial Stadium in Columbia, Missouri.

The team's leading scorer was Sidney Johnson with 18 points.

Schedule

References

Missouri
Missouri Tigers football seasons
Missouri Tigers football